GoTo, formerly LogMeIn Inc., is a flexible-work provider of software as a service (SaaS) and cloud-based remote work tools for collaboration and IT management, with products including GoTo Connect, GoTo Resolve, Rescue, Central, and more, built for small and midsized business IT departments but powerful enough for the enterprise. The company was founded in 2003 and based in Boston, Massachusetts, and rebranded from LogMeIn to GoTo on February 2, 2022. The rebrand to GoTo comes with a simplified product portfolio to a single application and two flagship products: the IT management and support product, GoTo Resolve, and a new experience for the unified-communications-as-a-service (UCaaS) product, GoTo Connect. These products are unified by a single application, administrative system, and converging user experience. 

The rebrand to GoTo announced the launch of a single application with two flagship products: GoTo Resolve for IT management and GoTo Connect for a collaboration application. 

On October 9, 2015, LogMeIn acquired LastPass for US$110 million. On December 14, 2021, the company announced that LastPass would spin off into its own cloud-based security company.

In February 2017, LogMeIn completed a merger with GetGo, the corporate spin-off of the GoTo product line from Citrix Systems.

On December 17, 2019, LogMeIn announced an agreement to be sold for $4.3 billion to Francisco Partners and Evergreen Coast Capital Corp., which is a private equity affiliate of Elliott Management Corporation. The deal closed on August 31, 2020.

History

LogMeIn was founded in 2003 in Budapest as 3am Labs, and changed its name in 2006.

3am Labs acquired the Hamachi VPN product.

LogMeIn, Inc., completed an initial public offering in 2009. Trading of LogMeIn, Inc., shares on the NASDAQ Global Market commenced on July 1, 2009.

In 2011, the company began a move into cloud services for the Internet of things by acquiring Pachube, which would later become the Xively service. In May 2014, it added to this initiative by acquiring Ionia Corp., which specializes in integrating connected objects.

LogMeIn, Inc., acquired Bold Software, LLC, in 2012.

The company abruptly discontinued LogMeIn Free on January 21, 2014, giving users only a seven-day grace period to migrate to LogMeIn Pro. 

LogMeIn acquired Meldium for $15M in September 2014 and retired the Meldium product offering in July 2017.

In July 2016, LogMeIn announced in  a merger with Citrix's GoTo products using a Reverse Morris Trust.

In February 2018, the company announced the sale of Xively to Google for $50M. Also in February 2018, the company announced the acquisition of Jive Communications for $342M.

On August 31, 2020, Elliott Management Corporation, by its affiliate Francisco Partners, completed its acquisition of LogMeIn, and LogMeIn's stock delisted from NASDAQ.

On February 2, 2022, LogMeIn was rebranded as GoTo, restoring the original brand that ExpertCity created in 1998, before Citrix Systems acquired it in 2004.

Products
The company's products are focused on three business areas, including Unified Communications & Collaboration services, Identity & Access Management services, and Customer engagement & support services. The products include:
GoTo UCC Products
 GoTo Connect
GoTo Meeting
GoTo Webinar
GoTo Training
GoTo Contact Center
 GoTo Room
 Grasshopper
 join.me
Remote Support
Rescue – remote support (help desk) web application used by large contact centers and help desks for diagnosing and troubleshooting computers, smartphones and tablets.
 Rescue Live Lens
 Rescue Live Guide
 GoTo Resolve
GoToMyPC
Pro – subscription-based remote access and administration software
Central – web application focused on IT management for remotely managing PCs and servers running on Windows or Mac OS X operating systems
Hamachi – network virtualization and VPN service
LogMeIn Backup – remote backup software
RemotelyAnywhere – remote access and administration software

See also
 Comparison of remote desktop software

References

External links

2003 establishments in Massachusetts
2009 initial public offerings
2020 mergers and acquisitions
American companies established in 2003
Companies based in Boston
Companies formerly listed on the Nasdaq
Private equity portfolio companies
Remote administration software
Remote desktop
Software companies based in Massachusetts
Software companies established in 2003
Software companies of the United States